Sierpinski is a lunar impact crater on the far side of the Moon. It lies to the southeast of the huge walled plain Gagarin, and to the northwest of the crater O'Day and the Mare Ingenii.

This crater has undergone some wear, particularly along the southwest where Sierpinski Q intrudes slightly into the inner wall. The rim is higher and the inner wall wider along the eastern side. There is a prominent ridge within the interior that extends from near the midpoint to the northern inner wall. There are several small craters along the inner wall in the north and northwest. Only a small portion of the interior floor along the western half is relatively level.

Satellite craters
By convention these features are identified on lunar maps by placing the letter on the side of the crater midpoint that is closest to Sierpinski.

References

External links
 Lunar Map 103, showing Sierpinski and surroundings (Regional maps at the Lunar and Planetary Institute.)

External links
 Moon Nomenclature on the NASA site

Impact craters on the Moon